Dan Patrik Sundström (born 12 August 1970) is a Swedish former footballer who played as a midfielder.

References

1970 births
Living people
Association football midfielders
Swedish footballers
Allsvenskan players
Högaborgs BK players
Malmö FF players
Helsingborgs IF players
Landskrona BoIS players
Sweden under-21 international footballers